The following tables compare general and technical information for a number of documentation generators.  Please see the individual products' articles for further information. Unless otherwise specified in footnotes, comparisons are based on the stable versions without any add-ons, extensions or external programs.  Note that many of the generators listed are no longer maintained.

General information 
Basic general information about the generators, including: creator or company, license, and price.

Supported formats 
The output formats the generators can write.

Other features

See also 

 Code readability
 Documentation generator
 Literate programming
 Self-documenting code

Notes

References

Documentation generators